Granville Wilbur "Granny" Hamner (April 26, 1927 – September 12, 1993) was an American professional baseball shortstop and second baseman in Major League Baseball (MLB). Hamner was one of the key players on the "Whiz Kids", the  National League (NL) champion Philadelphia Phillies.

Career
Hamner was born in Richmond, Virginia and graduated from Benedictine High School. His brother Garvin was also an infielder in the big leagues. "Granny" spent  years with the Phillies, having come to the club as a 17-year-old during World War II. In 1945, still seventeen, he became the youngest player ever to start an Opening Day game, a record that still stands as of 2022. By the Phillies' 1950 NL pennant season, he was one of the team leaders, age 23. A right-handed hitting shortstop with moderate power, Hamner compiled more than 80 runs batted in (RBI) four times. 

In the 1950 World Series, a four-game New York Yankees sweep dominated by Yankee pitchers, Hamner batted .429 (6 for 14) with three extra-base hits. In March 1952, manager Eddie Sawyer named Hamner team captain of the Phillies.

An All-Star three years in a row, Hamner was the National League's starting shortstop in the 1952 All-Star Game, played on his home field, Shibe Park, in Philadelphia. The game was called off after five innings due to rain.

On May 16, Hamner was traded to the Cleveland Indians, but he batted only .164 for the remainder of the campaign. Hamner then became a Kansas City Athletics’ Minor League Baseball (MiLB), manager, reappearing briefly with the A's as a pitcher during the 1962 season. (He had begun dabbling on the mound for the 1956-57 Phillies). But the change did not prolong Hamner's playing career. He briefly managed in the Phils' farm system in the 1970s and 1980s.

In 17 major league seasons, Hamner compiled a .262 batting average with 104 home runs. As a pitcher, he was winless with two losses, with an earned run average (ERA) of 5.40, in seven games, and  innings pitched.

Later life
In 1980, Hamner was one of several drivers who were able to stop their vehicles on the Sunshine Skyway Bridge in Florida before reaching the gap in the roadway caused by the collapse of a span after the freighter MV Summit Venture collided with the bridge.

In 1981, Hamner was inducted into the Virginia Sports Hall of Fame.

On September 12, 1993, Hamner died of a heart attack at age 66 in Philadelphia.

Notes

Further reading

External links

1927 births
1993 deaths
Binghamton Triplets managers
Binghamton Triplets players
Cleveland Indians players
Kansas City Athletics players
Major League Baseball shortstops
National League All-Stars
Norfolk Tides managers
Philadelphia Phillies players
Portsmouth-Norfolk Tides players
Reading Phillies managers
Richmond Virginians (minor league) players
Baseball players from Richmond, Virginia
Utica Blue Sox players